Angélica, mi vida, is an American telenovela created and produced by Telemundo and Ángel del Cerro in 1988, in cooperation with Capitalvision International Corporation.

Cast 
 Laura Fabián as Angélica
 Carlos Montalvo as Alfredo
 Alicia Montoya as Inés
 Teresa Yenque as Amanda
 Kenya Hernández as Sonia
 James Víctor as Jaime
 Zaide Silvia Gutiérrez as Laura
 Jorge Villanueva as José Luis
 Ana M. Martínez Casado as Raquel
 Bertila Damas as Marta
 Jorge Luis Morejón as Raúl
 Marcos Beatancourt as César
 Germán Barrios as Pedro Juan
 Gloria Hayes as Julie
 Gerardo Lugo as Carlos
 Ivette Rodriguez as Lily
 Alejandro Joglar as Freddie
 Ava Alers as Delfina 
 Tomás Goros as Ricardo
 Ricardo Pald as Paul
 Ilka Tanya Payán as Carmen Delia
 Jorge Luis Ramos as Alejandro
 Alba Raquel Barros as Sasha
 Rosa Blanca Menéndez as Edith
 Lucianne Silva as Susana
 Jaime Bello as Walter
 Lourdes Morán as María
 Osvaldo Ríos as Dan
 Carlos Llerandi as Padre Nolan
 Eusebia Beatancourt as Maggie

References 

Telemundo telenovelas
1988 telenovelas
Spanish-language telenovelas